The Ukrainian Labour Temple is a hall and cultural centre in the north end of Winnipeg, Manitoba. It is run by the Association of United Ukrainian Canadians and is located at 591 Pritchard Avenue.

The labour temple is one of the few left in a once large network of such halls and is one of the largest and oldest of its kind. The building was constructed from 1918–19 using volunteer labour. The building was designated a National Historic Site of Canada in 2009.

See also
 Association of United Ukrainian Canadians
 411 Seniors Centre, formerly Vancouver's Labor Temple, where events in the 1918 Vancouver general strike took place
 Finnish Labour Temple, Thunder Bay
 San Francisco Labor Temple

References

External links
Government of Manitoba Heritage site No. 91 Ukrainian Labor Temple | Provincial Heritage Sites | Historic Resources Branch

Buildings and structures in Winnipeg
Community centres in Canada
National Historic Sites in Manitoba
Buildings and structures on the National Historic Sites of Canada register
Labour Temple
Labour in Canada
Ukrainian cultural centres
1919 establishments in Manitoba
Buildings and structures completed in 1919
North End, Winnipeg
Municipal Historical Resources of Winnipeg
Provincial Heritage Sites of Manitoba
Trade union buildings in Canada